Gillo is a given name and surname. 

Notable people with the given name include:
Gillo Dorfles (1910–2018), Italian art critic, painter, and philosopher
Gillo Pontecorvo (1919–2006), Italian filmmaker

Notable people with the surname include:
Hank Gillo (1894–1948), American football player

Notable people with the nickname include:
Michele Frangilli (1976-), Italian archer